The Roman Catholic Diocese of Guarda is a diocese located in central eastern Portugal, a suffragan in the Ecclesiastical province of the Latin Patriarchate of Lisbon in southern Portugal.

The present episcopal seat is in Guarda Cathedral in the city of Guarda. The diocese also contains the Church of São Luís in Pinhel, once the cathedral of the former diocese of Pinhel, absorbed into the diocese of Guarda in 1881.

Statistics 
As per 2014, it pastorally served 253,300 Catholics (96.0% of 263,900 total) on 6,759 km² in 361 parishes and 3 missions with 140 priests (126 diocesan, 14 religious), 17 deacons, 133 lay religious (26 brothers, 107 sisters) and 5 seminarians.

History 
 Possibly in 550, no later than 569, a Diocese of Egitânia (viz.), with see in present Idanha-a-Velha, was established under the Kingdom of the Suebi and maintained by the Visigothic Kingdom which absorbed it by 585. However, due to the Moorish conquest, in 715 it was suppressed, its Cathedral of Idanha-a-Velha later converted into a mosque.
 In 1199 that was nominally restored as Diocese of Guarda, which claimed the apostolic succession but switched the see to Guarda where it built a new cathedral, without awarding even co-cathedral status to the old see.
 On 1549.08.21 it lost territory to establish the Diocese of Portalegre
 On 1881.09.30 it gained territory from the Diocese of Coimbra and gained territory from the suppressed Diocese of Pinhel.

Episcopal ordinaries
(all Roman rite) 

Suffragan Bishops of Guarda
 Martinho Pais (1200 – 1225)
 Vicente Hispano (1226 – 1248)
 Rodrigo Fernandes (1248 – 1267)
 Bishop Vasco (1267 – 1278)
 João Martins (Juan Martínez), Friars Minor (O.F.M.) (1278 – 1301), previously Bishop of Cádiz (Spain) (1266 – 1278.12.24)
 Vasco Martins de Alvelos (1302 – death October 23, 1313), previously Bishop of Lamego (Portugal) (1297 – 1302)
 Bishop Rodrigo (1313 – 1313)
 Bishop Estêvão (1314 – 1316)
 Bishop Martinho (1319 – 1322)
 Bishop Guterres (1322 – 1326)
 Bishop Bartolomeu (1326 – 1345)
 Afonso Dinis (1346 – 1347), later Bishop of Évora (Portugal) (1347.10.15 – death 1352)
 Bishop Lourenço (1349 – 1356)
 Estêvão Tristão (? – 1357)
 Gil Cabral de Viana (? – 1360)
 Vasco de Menezes (1362 – 1367)
 Gonçalo Martins (1367)
 Afonso Correia (1367 – 1384)
 Vasco de Lamego (? – 1384)
 Afonso Ferraz (? – 1396)
 Gil (1397 – 1397)
 Gonçalo Vasques da Cunha (1397–1426)
 Luís da Guerra (1427 – 1458)
 João Manuel, Carmelite Order (O. Carm.) (July 9, 1459 – death 1476), previously Titular Bishop of Tiberias (1442.04.18 – 1444.07.20), Bishop of Ceuta (Spain) (1444.07.20 – 1459.07.09)
 João Manuel Ferras (March 17, 1477 – death 1478), previously Bishop of Viseu (Portugal) (1526.11.21 – 1547.04.22)
 Álvaro de Chaves (1479 – 1481 see below)
Apostolic Administrator Garcia de Menezes (1481 – death 1484), while Bishop of Évora (Portugal) (1471 – 1484)
 Álvaro de Chaves (see above 1484 – 1496)
 Pedro Vaz Gavião (1496 – 1516)Apostolic Administrator sede plena Miguel da Silva (1516–1519), later Bishop of Viseu (Portugal) (1526.11.21 – 1547.04.22), created Cardinal-Priest of Ss. XII Apostoli (1542.02.06 – 1543.10.05), transferred Cardinal-Priest of S. Prassede (1543.10.05 – 1552.06.27), also Apostolic Administrator of Massa Marittima (Italy) (1549.05.20 – 1555), repeatedly transferred Cardinal-Priest of S. Marcello (1552.06.27 – 1553.11.29), Cardinal-Priest of S. Pancrazio (1553.11.29 – 1553.12.11), Cardinal-Priest of S. Maria in Trastevere (1553.12.11 – death 1556.06.05)

BIOs TO ELABORATE
 Cardinal Afonso de Portugal (September 9, 1516 – February 23, 1519)
 Jorge de Melo (1519–1548)
 Cristóvão de Castro (1550–1552)
 João de Portugal (1556–1585)
 Nuno de Noronha (1594–1608)
 Archbishop Afonso Furtado de Mendonça (February 13, 1610 – 1616)
 Francisco de Castro (1617–1630)
 Lopo de Sequeira Pereira (1632 – August 4, 1636)
 Dinis de Melo e Castro (1639–1639)
 Father Diogo Lobo (1640–1640)
 Archbishop Pedro de Lencastre (1643–1648)
 Álvaro de São Boaventura (1669–1672)
 Archbishop Luís da Silva Teles (1685–1691)
 João de Mascarenhas (1691 – January 24, 1692)
 Archbishop Rodrigo de Moura Telles (1694–1704)
 António de Saldanha (1705 – June 28, 1711)
 João de Mendonça (1713 – August 2, 1736)
 Archbishop José Fialho, O. Cist. (January 2, 1741 – March 18, 1741)
 Bernardo António de Melo Osório (1742–1774)
 Jerónimo Rogado de Carvalhal e Silva (1773 – February 19, 1797)
 José António Pinto de Mendonça Arrais (1797–1822)
 Carlos de São José de Azevedo e Sousa (1824–1828)
 Joaquim José Pacheco Sousa (1832–1857)
 Manuel Martins Manso (March 18, 1858 – December 1, 1878)
 Tommaso Gomes de Almeida (August 9, 1883 – January 3, 1903)
 Archbishop Manuel Vieira de Matos (April 1, 1903 – October 1, 1914)
 Giuseppe Alves Matoso (October 3, 1914 – February 1, 1952)
 Domenico da Silva Gonçavles (February 1, 1952 – June 4, 1960)
 Policarpo da Costa Vaz (高德華) (July 9, 1960 – November 17, 1979)
 António dos Santos (November 17, 1979 – December 1, 2005)
 Manuel da Rocha Felício (December 1, 2005 - ... )

See also 
 List of Catholic dioceses in Portugal
 Roman Catholic Diocese of Egitânia
 Roman Catholicism in Portugal

References

Sources and external links
 GCatholic.org - data for all sections 
 Catholic Hierarchy 

Roman Catholic dioceses in Portugal
Dioceses established in the 6th century
Guarda, Roman Catholic Diocese of